Megan Gerety (born October 14, 1971) is former World Cup alpine ski racer from the United States. A specialist in the speed events, she competed in the 1994 Winter Olympics.

After retiring from competition, Gerety married longtime boyfriend Tommy Moe in 2003.  They have two daughters and live in Wilson, Wyoming.

External links
 
 Megan Gerety World Cup standings at the International Ski Federation
 
 

1971 births
Living people
American female alpine skiers
Olympic alpine skiers of the United States
Alpine skiers at the 1994 Winter Olympics
People from Wilson, Wyoming